Enemy You was an American punk rock band from San Francisco, California, United States, that formed in 1997.

Biography
Prior to their formation, David Jones, the main songwriter in Enemy You, recorded several releases with his pop punk band After School Special on Mutant Pop Records. The group never toured or played a show, but still had a small dedicated following. In 1997, Enemy You was formed and began rehearsing together. They were heavily inspired by Bad Religion and other melodic punk acts. After Enemy You began writing tunes together as a band they received interest from Ben Weasel and his fledgling label, Panic Button Records. Weasel would often call Fat Wreck Chords, and heard about the band through Chris, who was the bassist for Enemy You, and an employee at Fat Wreck Chords. This led to their debut appearance on the four-way split dubbed Four On The Floor alongside Screeching Weasel, Teen Idols and Moral Crux. This was followed by their debut album, Where No One Knows My Name, in 1999. Based on the album's success the band was asked to open for a number of notable punk bands including Bouncing Souls, Lagwagon, Bad Religion, T.S.O.L., Mad Caddies, and NOFX. The band released a 7-inch on the Fat Club series on Fat Wreck Chords. They followed that with an 1980s-themed seven inch EP that came out on Geykido Comet Records, titled "Video to Radio." Geykido Comet Records re-released the EP in 2017, with all the proceeds going to suicide prevention. Around this time, guitarist, Ken Yamazaki, started to play guitar for the Hardcore punk band, Western Addiction. He still stayed with Enemy You, though. In 2005 the band released their second album, Stories Never Told on Red Scare Industries. David was friends with label owner, Toby Jeg, and the label also eventually re-released [Where No One Knows My Name. Enemy You then signed with Nitro Records. Their third studio album, Fade Away was released as an iTunes Store exclusive on December 2, 2008, after being shelved for a few years. Vocalist David Jones committed suicide in March 2015.

Members
 David Jones – lead vocals, guitar
 Ken Yamazaki – guitar
 Joe Yamazaki – drums 
 Chris Matulich – bass guitar

Discography

Albums
1999: Where No One Knows My Name - Panic Button/Lookout
2004: Stories Never Told - Red Scare
2008: Fade Away (iTunes Exclusive) - Nitro Records

EPs 
 Fat Club seven inch - Fat Wreck Chords 2001
 Video To Radio seven inch - Geykido Comet Records  2002

Compilation appearances 
 Four on the Floor - Panic Button/Lookout 1998
 Short Music for Short People - Fat Wreck Chords 1999
 Thrasher Video "Scorchin' Summer" Thrasher magazine  2002
 8 Ball Zine Compilation (Spain) 2003
 Every Dog Will Have Its Day - Adeline Records 2004
 Radio Disaster Vol. 8 V/A - Basement Records 2004
 This Just In... Benefit For Indy Media - Geykido Comet Records 2005
 AMP Presents Vol. 4 Pop Punk - American Music Press (AMP) 2005
 Wrecktrospective - Fat Wreck Chords 2009

References

External links
Redscare
Nitro
Geykido Comet Records

Geykido Comet Records
Musical groups from San Francisco
Pop punk groups from California